Aung Zaw Win is a Rohingya rights activist and politician who served as a member of parliament in Myanmar's House of Representatives.

Career 
Win was a businessman and member of the Union Solidarity and Development Party. He served as a member of parliament for Maungdaw in Rakhine State.

Win was arrested at Yangon International Airport while he was on his way to Bangkok on 28 February 2018. He was charged with providing financial support to the Arakan Rohingya Salvation Army. His charges were met with skepticism by Rohingya activists due to Win's close relationship with the military establishment prior to his arrest.

References 

Rohingya politicians
Union Solidarity and Development Party politicians
Members of Pyithu Hluttaw
Living people
People from Rakhine State
Year of birth missing (living people)